Rykel de Bruyne is a Dutch malacologist.

He is the coordinator of the "Atlas Project of Dutch Mollusca" (Atlasproject Nederlandse Mollusken) by ANEMOON Foundation (Stichting Anemoon) and has contributed greatly to the popularization of malacology in the Netherlands.

He worked for the "National Institute for Fisheries Research" (Rijks Instituut voor Visserij Onderzoek, RIVO) at the Institute for Marine Resources & Ecosystem Studies, the former "Geological Survey" (Rijks Geologische Dienst), the Muséum national d'histoire naturelle in Paris, the National Museum of Natural History in Leiden (Rijksmuseum van Natuurlijke Historie) and the Expert Center for Taxonomic Identification (ETI) in Amsterdam. He is also affiliated with the Department of Malacology of the Zoological Museum in Amsterdam (Zoölogisch Museum Amsterdam).

He was also involved with Spirula, the Dutch malacological journal.

Especially the "Field Guide shells" (Veldgids schelpen) is considered one of the best and complete work on the shells of molluscs from the southeastern North Sea.

Bibliography 
(incomplete)
  Boer T. W. de & Bruyne R. H. de (1991). Schelpen van de Friese Waddeneilanden (1st edition). Fryske Akademy & Backhuys publ. , 292 pp. (2nd edition: 300 pp.).
  Bruyne R. H. de (1991). Schelpen van de Nederlandse kust. Jeugdbondsuitgeverij Stichting Uitgeverij KNNV, 165 pp.
  Bruyne R. H. de, Bank R. A., Adema J. P. H. M. & Perk F. A. (1994). Nederlandse naamlijst van de weekdieren (Mollusca) van Nederland en België. Feestuitgave ter gelegenheid van het zestigjarig jubileum van de Nederlandse Malacologische Vereniging. Backhuys, Leiden. 149 pp. .
  Bruyne R. de & Neckheim T. (eds.) (2001). Van Nonnetje tot Tonnetje. De recente en fossiele weekdieren (slakken en schelpen) van Amsterdam, Schuyt & Co, Haarlem, 207 pp.
  Bruyne R. H. de (2003). Geïllustreerde Schelpenencyclopedie, Rebo Productions, .
  , 2003. Bedreigde en verdwenen land- en zoetwatermollusken in Nederland (Mollusca). Basisrapport met voorstel voor de Rode Lijst. European Invertebrate Survey Nederland (EIS), Leiden & Stichting ANEMOON, Heemstede. 88 pag.
  Bruyne R. H. de (2004). Veldgids Schelpen. KNNV Uitgeverij, 234 pp., 
  Bruyne R. H. de & Boer Th. W. de (2008). Schelpen van de Waddeneilanden. Gids van de schelpen en weekdieren van Texel, Vlieland, Terschelling, Ameland en Schiermonnikoog. Fontaine Uitgevers. 359 pp., .
  Bruyne, R. H. de & Gmelig Meyling, A. W. (2019). Basisgids Strandvondsten. Kennismaking met het zeeleven langs de Nederlandse kust. 144 pp. Uitg. KNNV (with Stichting ANEMOON). 
  Bruyne, R. H. de (2020). Veldgids Schelpen. Zeeschelpen en weekdieren uit ons Noordzeegebied. Zeist. KNNV Uitgeverij (with Stichting ANEMOON & JBU). 304 p.

References

  Data archiving and networked services: R.H. de Bruyne

Dutch malacologists
Year of birth missing (living people)
Living people